Christian Egypt may refer to:
Christianity in Egypt, an overview of the Christian religion in contemporary Egypt
Christian-majority Egypt from the 3rd to 6th centuries (see Roman Egypt#Christianity)

See also
Coptic history
Diocese of Egypt